Hilary Bell may refer to:

 Hilary Bell (swimmer) (born 1991), Canadian swimmer
 Hilary Bell (writer) (born 1966), Australian writer
 Hilary Bell (television producer) (1965–2010), British reality television pioneer

See also
 Hilari Bell (born 1958), American fantasy writer